Ricky Bochem (born 18 October 1982 in the Netherlands) is a Dutch retired footballer.

References

Dutch footballers
Living people
1982 births
Association football midfielders
SBV Vitesse players
Helmond Sport players